St. Mary's High School is a small, co-educational, college-preparatory Catholic high school located in downtown Annapolis, Maryland.  It is part of the Roman Catholic Archdiocese of Baltimore.  St. Mary's is accredited by  AdvancED, the Archdiocese of Baltimore, and is recognized and approved by the Maryland State Department of Education.

History
St. Mary's High School is co-located with its affiliated parish church St. Mary's Church and elementary school. The church and parish itself date back to 1853 with the arrival of the Redemptorists in Baltimore. St. Mary's School (elementary) was founded in 1862 and the high school was added in 1946.

Demographics
The demographic breakdown of the 479 students enrolled in 2017-2018 was:
Native American/Alaskan - 0.2%
Asian/Pacific islanders - 1.4%
African American - 3%
Hispanic - 3.2%
White - 85.1%
Multiracial - 7%

Campus features
The school is located in downtown Annapolis on Duke of Gloucester Street.  It is connected by a hallway and outdoor walkway with St. Mary's Elementary School, with whom it also shares a library building, and shares its grounds with St. Mary's Church as well as the Charles Carroll House, the historic home of Charles Carroll of Annapolis.  Originally, the School Sisters of Notre Dame maintained a convent on the property; that building has since been transformed primarily into a library and computer labs. Classrooms and hallways are based on a traditional corridor basis (A, B, and C), with lockers located in each along the walls.  The gymnasium is named after C. Mason "Daffy" Russell, a longtime coach at St. Mary's.

Being located in a dense, urban area and surrounded by historic properties, the school does not have athletic fields of its own on campus. Historically, the school has utilized practice facilities at Bates Middle School and Germantown Elementary School for practices and used various sites in the area for home games.

Academics
St. Mary's offers AP and Honors classes for advanced students. In 2016, St. Mary's immersed their student body and faculty with a 1:1 iPad program. A program offered at the high school is their St. Isidore Cyber Program, designated for students interested in a STEM-based program of study and internship, designed to develop student proficiency and exploration in the areas of science, technology, engineering, and math.

Student life
The school newspaper is The Crabnet, and St. Mary's has a total of 25 clubs, including a sailing team, Model UN, and a variety of others. Campus ministry is a big component of student life. Each year, students must attend a retreat. Their senior year, the students participated in Kairos.

Athletics
The school's main rival is the Severn School. They play lacrosse in a match called "Battle Lax" and football in a game called "The River Classic."

St. Mary's participates in the Maryland Interscholastic Athletic Association (MIAA), primarily in boy's athletics, and the Interscholastic Athletic Association of Maryland (IAAM), primarily in girl's athletics. The school fields the following sports:

Fall
Cross Country (Varsity - Boys), Cross Country (Varsity - Girls), Field Hockey (Junior Varsity & Varsity - Girls), Football (JV & Varsity - Boys), Soccer (JV & Varsity - Boys), Soccer (JV & Varsity - Girls), Volleyball (JV & Varsity - Girls).

Winter
Basketball (JV & Varsity - Boys), Basketball (JV & Varsity - Girls), Ice Hockey (Varsity - Boys), Swimming (Varsity - Boys), Swimming (Varsity - Girls), Wrestling (Varsity - Boys).

Spring
Baseball (JV & Varsity - Boys), Lacrosse (Freshman/Sophomore, JV, & Varsity - Boys), Lacrosse (FR/SO, JV, & Varsity - Girls), Golf (Varsity - Boys & Girls), Tennis (Varsity - Boys & Girls), Track (Varsity Boys), Track (Varsity Girls).

Notable alumni
Robert C. Baldwin, Maryland Delegate
Michael E. Busch, former Speaker of the Maryland House of Delegates
Chuck Bresnahan, former defensive coordinator for the Cincinnati Bengals
Henry Ciccarone, Hall of Fame lacrosse coach for Johns Hopkins
John Dorsey, NFL executive and former player
Chris Garrity, professional lacrosse player
Joshua Grannell, actor, filmmaker, and drag queen known as Peaches Christ
Terry Hutchinson, sailor
Peter Oakley, Senator from Maryland

See also

National Catholic Educational Association

References

External links
Roman Catholic Archdiocese of Baltimore

The Crabnet - The Online Student Newspaper of St. Mary's High School

Christianity in Annapolis, Maryland
Schools in Anne Arundel County, Maryland
Buildings and structures in Annapolis, Maryland
Catholic secondary schools in Maryland
School Sisters of Notre Dame schools
Educational institutions established in 1860
1860 establishments in Maryland